Rosko Shane Specman  (born 28 April 1989) is a South African rugby union player for the  in Super Rugby, the  in the Currie Cup and the  in the Rugby Challenge. His usual position is winger.

Specman was a member of the South African Sevens team that won a bronze medal at the 2016 Summer Olympics.

Rugby career

Youth

Vodacom Cup

He made his debut for the Sharks in the 2010 Vodacom Cup quarter final game against . He was a first choice player in the U21 team that year, scoring three tries. The following season, he scored four tries in five appearances in the 2011 Vodacom Cup and made another five appearances in the 2012 Vodacom Cup.

He was a member of the Pumas side that won the Vodacom Cup for the first time in 2015, beating  24–7 in the final. His only appearance during the season came in the final after returning from South Africa Sevens duty.

Representative rugby

In 2013, Specman was included in a South Africa President's XV team that played in the 2013 IRB Tbilisi Cup and won the tournament after winning all three matches.

Specman was also called into a South Africa Sevens training squad in 2013 and was included in the Sevens squad for the USA leg of the 2013–14 IRB Sevens World Series.
Specman was included in a 12-man squad for the 2016 Summer Olympics in Rio de Janeiro. He was named as a substitute for their first match in Group B of the competition against Spain, with South Africa winning the match 24–0.

Cheetahs
Along with sevens teammates Cecil Afrika and Chris Dry, Specman announced that he was joining the Cheetahs beginning in 2017. He scored his first Pro14 try at home in October 2017 against the Glasgow Warriors.

Bulls

Notes

References

External links
 
 
 
 
 

South African rugby union players
Living people
1989 births
Rugby union wings
Sharks (Currie Cup) players
Pumas (Currie Cup) players
People from Makhanda, Eastern Cape
South Africa international rugby sevens players
Rugby sevens players at the 2016 Summer Olympics
Olympic rugby sevens players of South Africa
Olympic bronze medalists for South Africa
Olympic medalists in rugby sevens
Medalists at the 2016 Summer Olympics
Rugby sevens players at the 2018 Commonwealth Games
South Africa international rugby union players
Free State Cheetahs players
Cheetahs (rugby union) players
Bulls (rugby union) players
Blue Bulls players
Stormers players
Rugby union players from the Eastern Cape
Alumni of Kingswood College (South Africa)
Griquas (rugby union) players